Leonard M. Tannenbaum (born August 9, 1971) is the founder and chief executive officer of AFC Gamma Inc., a commercial mortgage REIT which trades on the NASDAQ exchange under the ticker AFCG.  Previously, he was the founder and chief executive officer of Fifth Street Asset Management, which was sold to Oaktree Asset Management in 2017. He also founded the pro-business political action committee "Keeping America Competitive".

Early life and education
Tannenbaum was born to a Jewish family, the son of Adele Fuchsberg and Calvin M. Tannenbaum. His father was a managing partner of Brecher, Fishman, Feit, Heller, Rubin, & Tannenbaum, a law firm in New York; his mother was a district administrator for the Nassau County Board of Cooperative Educational Services and an exile from Cuba. He graduated with a BS in economics and an MBA in finance as part of a submatriculation program from the Wharton School of the University of Pennsylvania. He is a Chartered Financial Analyst holder. After school he worked as an equity analyst for Merrill Lynch.

Career
In 1998, he founded Fifth Street Finance, a finance company specializing in raising funds from private investors and investing in small- and mid-sized companies. He raised $30 million ($15 million from his father-in-law, Bruce E. Toll) and established his first fund which made investments until 2004. In January 2005, he launched a second fund, Fifth Street Mezzanine Partners II which reached $157 million in value and included institutional investors such as DuPont, Sumitomo Bank and WP Global; the fund stopped investing in 2007. In 2007, he launched a third fund, which in 2008, after taking the advice of David Einhorn, he converted into a business development company (BDC). This entity, named Fifth Street Finance Corp., went public in May 2008. Fifth Street's customers are primarily private equity firms that invest in lower middle-market or middle-market companies (averaging $10 million in EBITDA). Investments average $35 million and never exceed $100 million. Effective September 2014, they received permission form the S.E.C. to increase the maximum investment across its platform to $250 million. In 2017 Fifth Street Asset Management was sold to Oaktree Asset Management.

In 2020 he founded AFC GAMMA (AFC) out of his family office and in March 2021 took the mortgage REIT AFC Gamma public on the Nasdaq trading under the ticker AFCG. The company is a institutional-quality lender to commercial real estate with a specialty in cannabis and loans are secured by cash flows, licenses (in limited license states) and real estate.

Tannenbaum is a supporter of the Robin Hood Foundation, Kids in Crisis, United Way and the American Red Cross.

Tannenbaum is also the Chief Executive Officer of LMT Investments LLC and the President of the Leonard M. Tannenbaum Foundation.

Personal life
In 1997, Tannenbaum married Elizabeth Toll, daughter of housing developer Bruce E. Toll, in a Jewish ceremony at the Ritz Carlton in Philadelphia. They had three children Stephen, Max and Adam and divorced in October 2010. After the divorce, Bruce E. Toll filed an unsuccessful lawsuit against Tannenbaum alleging that he had promised and failed to pay Elizabeth half the profits from the management of Fifth Street’s latest fund.

In 2013, he married Stacey Thorne and the couple divorced in 2016. (son, Justin)

Len married Robyn (Friedman) Tannenbaum in November 2019.  They have a daughter Gemma.

He has five children (Stephen, Max, Adam, Justin and Gemma).

Max was the President of Dream Dragons, a company launched by 13 high school students through the Southwestern Connecticut chapter of Junior Achievement program, which empowers young entrepreneurs.

References

1970s births
20th-century American Jews
American money managers
American philanthropists
Wharton School of the University of Pennsylvania alumni
Living people
Hispanic and Latino American people
CFA charterholders
Merrill (company) people
21st-century American Jews